Richard Morrow Groat (born November 4, 1930) is a former professional baseball and basketball player who was an eight-time All-Star shortstop and two-time World Series champion in Major League Baseball. He rates as one of the most accomplished two-sport athletes in American sports history, a college All-America in baseball and basketball as well as one of only 13 to ever play both at the professional level. 

He finished his career with a .286 batting average and 2,138 hits with four National League teams in 14 seasons. 
 
Yet Groat was more naturally gifted in basketball, which was his real passion. The 5-foot-11 guard attended Duke University as a member of the Sigma Chi fraternity, where he was a two-time All-America, two-time McKelvin Award winner as the Southern Conference athlete of the year and the first basketball player to have his number (10) retired in school history. Groat was selected for the 1950–51 Helms National Player of the Year Award, when he became the first player to lead the nation in points (26.0) and assists (7.6) per game in one season.

In 1952, the Fort Wayne Pistons selected Groat at the No. 3 pick of the National Basketball Association draft, but his early success was interrupted by a two-year stint in the armed forces. When Pirates management forced him to make a career decision upon his return, he chose his hometown team and Major League Baseball largely because of financial considerations. 

For seven seasons (1956–62), Groat teamed with future Hall of Fame second baseman Bill Mazeroski to give the Pirates one of the most efficient keystone combinations in baseball history. He led the NL in double plays a record five times, putouts four times and assists twice. He ranked ninth in major league history in games played at shortstop (1,877) and fourth in double plays (1,237). He also was among the NL career leaders in putouts (10th, 3,505), assists (8th, 5,811) and total chances (9th, 9,690).

In 2011, Groat was inducted into the National College Baseball Hall of Fame. In doing so, he became the first person to be admitted to the college basketball and baseball halls of fame.

Hit-and-run mastery
At 175 pounds, Groat lacked the physical ability to be a long-ball threat. Rather, he was a line-drive hitter who learned at a young age that he would have to hit the ball to all fields in order to be successful, a part of the game that he worked at incessantly. As a result, Groat was one of the most difficult hitters to defend against in his era. What's more, he walked more than he struck out in six of his 13 full seasons, a testament to his plate discipline.  

Quick hands, keen baseball instincts and a will to win made Groat an ideal candidate for the second spot in the batting order. There he was a master of the hit-and-run play, a skill that he developed under Pirates batting coach George Sisler, who was a Hall of Fame hitter back in the day. 

When first base was occupied with Groat at the plate, the Pirates runner would often take off on the pitch. Either the shortstop or usually the second baseman was required to cover second base because of the potential for a stolen base, which left no defender at one of the spots before the ball reached the plate. Groat had an uncanny knack to drive the ball through the vacated hole for a hit, or move the runner into scoring position via a groundout.

Pro baseball career

Baseball didn't always come easily for Groat in his formative years. Many a scout was unimpressed by his foot speed and arm strength in particular. In college, he was regularly clocked at 4.1 seconds from home plate to first base, which was merely average for his size. 

"Baseball at times became real work, especially knowing that I had the handicap that I couldn't run," Groat conceded. "If I could have run, I would have been a much better baseball player."

What Groat did have were uncommon instincts, tireless work ethic and competitive fire. The Pirates talent evaluators saw this as early as his days at Swissvale High School just outside of Pittsburgh, where the kid earned letters in baseball, basketball and volleyball.  

Joe Brown was Pirates general manager in the final seven seasons that Groat spent with the team. In a 1961 Sport magazine story, Brown described his value like this: "(Groat) sets an example for the rest of the team. If he goes 5-for-5 and the loses, he's unhappy. If he goes zero-for-5 and the team wins, he's happy. He's a constant reminder to the other players that a fellow can make himself a star without having all the tools."  

After Groat completed his junior year of college, general manager Branch Rickey offered him a chance to play professional baseball and complete his degree in the off-season. He respectfully declined out of deference to Duke and its scholarship commitment. At the same time, Groat assured Rickey that, if the same contract offer was extended one year later, he would accept it. 

The St. Louis Cardinals and New York Giants also expressed interest in Groat, but Pittsburgh had the home field advantage. He had always hoped to play in near his hometown of Swissvale, a mere six miles from Forbes Field, which the Pirates called home. When Rickey repeated his offer in 1952 as expected, Groat signed his first professional contract believed to be worth $35,000 to $40,000, which included a lucrative $25,000 bonus. The 21-year-old joined the parent club on June 17 in New York, and without a day of minor league experience, he batted a team-high .284 for the remainder of the season, one of the few bright spots for the NL cellar dwellers.

After his MLB debut, Groat embarked on his second career, this one with the Pistons of the NBA. Four months into the season, he enlisted in the Army rather than delay the inevitable. He chose that time so his release would coincide with the start of baseball training camp two years later. During his military stint, he led Fort Belvoir teams to worldwide Army championships in baseball and basketball, the first time a single base had achieved the feat in the same year. He hit .362 on the diamond and averaged 35 points per game on the court. 

One year later, he set a dubious MLB record – most at-bats (520) without a home run or stolen base in one season. In an attempt to improve their tenuous relationship, manager Bobby Bragan named him team captain midway through the season. Groat hit a respectable .273 overall, but after his average tailed off in the final two months, he spent more time on his mechanics in the off-season. To that end, he lowered his hands in his stance, which shortened the path to the ball.

The adjustment paid immediate dividends for Groat at the outset of the  season. He hit .319 in April and .370 in May, which put him in early contention for the NL batting title. He finished with a .315 average (fifth in the league) and a career-high seven home runs. On September 29, he threw out the final Giants batter in the last game they played at the Polo Grounds before moving to San Francisco in 1958. 

In , Groat proved that the previous season was no fluke. He hit .300 and led the NL in putouts and double plays, as the Pirates surprised the baseball world with a second-place finish. It marked the first time that they had placed higher than seventh in nine years. 

He hit .275 and paced the NL in putouts and double plays once again. The team finished last in home runs in the league, which convinced Brown to pursue a power hitter in the offseason. One potential trade would have sent Groat to the Kansas City Athletics in exchange for Roger Maris, a highly regarded 24-year-old outfielder. Manager Danny Murtaugh opposed the move, however, and Brown eventually cooled on the idea. 

In 1960, Groat produced his best season yet, as the team captain became the first Pirate to be selected Most Valuable Player since Paul Waner in 1927. He hit .325 to become the first right-handed Pirates hitter to win the batting title since Honus Wagner in 1911. He sat out 20 days after his right wrist was fractured by a Lew Burdette pitch on September 6. Originally, Groat was expected to sidelined for at least one month. But he claimed to be a quick healer and lobbied hard for an early return in order to be better prepared for the expected trip to the World Series.

1960 World Series
While Groat hit a meager .214 against the Yankees in the 1960 Fall Classic, at least in part because his fractured wrist had yet to fully heal, he made contributions in three of the four victories. 

In the series opener, Groat tied the score on a double in the first inning. He came around on a Bob Skinner base hit to give the underdog Pirates an early 2–1 advantage. The lead held up, 6–4, as Groat and Mazeroski teamed up on a double play for the final outs. 

"There was a great deal of anticipation and maybe a lack of confidence, whatever you wanted to call it," Groat said of the mood before the series. "Because I remember vividly how winning that first game of a seven-game series meant so very, very much. When we got in the clubhouse, we all ended up saying, 'We can beat these guys!' That was kind of the theme after we won the first game."

In the fifth game, with his team ahead, 3–1, Groat doubled to lead off the third inning. Roberto Clemente followed with an RBI single for what proved to be the decisive run. The Pirates went on to a 5–3 triumph that gave them a 3–2 lead in the series. 

In Game 7, one of the wildest in postseason history, the Pirates trailed 7–4 in the seventh inning. Groat delivered an RBI single to ignite a five-run rally that staked his team to a 9–7 advantage. The Pirates went on to win 10–9 on Mazeroski's legendary walk-off home run in the ninth inning.

Controversial trade
In , Groat batted .275, and teamed with Mazeroski to lead the league in double plays. One season later, he improved to a .294 a batting average and finished third in the league in doubles (34). He also led the NL in putouts, assists and double plays.

While the 1962 Pirates bounced back with a 93-win season, Brown had grown concerned about a pitching staff that relied heavily on veterans whose best days were behind them. The 32-year-old Groat had an inkling that he would be traded while he still had value, and his fears were realized in November, when he was dealt to the St. Louis Cardinals in exchange for pitcher Don Cardwell, a 15-game winner the previous season. Groat was deeply hurt by the trade, having hoped to become a Pirates coach and possibly manager after retirement as a player. He severed ties the organization until a 1990 reunion of the 1960 World Series team. 

Fully intent to prove that Brown had made an egregious mistake, Groat responded with a vengeance in the  campaign. In his best season in the big leagues, he set career marks in RBI (73), hits (201), doubles (43), triples (11), on-base percentage (.377) and slugging percentage (.450) to finish second to Los Angeles Dodgers pitcher Sandy Koufax in the NL Most Valuable Player vote. His .319 batting average ranked fourth in the league, seven points behind the leader Tommy Davis (Dodgers).

While Groat produced a career-high 73 RBI in his Cardinals debut, manager Johnny Keane became convinced that he could be even more valuable as a run-producer. The veteran batted either third, fifth or sixth in the order on a regular basis in the 1964 season, when he drove in 70 runs. He hit .292, played consistent defense and continued to mentor younger teammates in a leadership role, as the Cardinals captured their first NL pennant in 18 years. He earned the final All-Star selection of his career and led the league in assists and double plays once again.

1964 World Series
For the second time in five years, Groat played against the Yankees in the World Series, this time as a member of the Cardinals. And once again, his team prevailed in seven games. 

In the crucial fourth game, Groat was involved in one of the turning points in the series. The Cardinals trailed 3–0 in the sixth inning and were on the verge of a 3–1 deficit in the series. With two runners on base, he hit a ground ball to second baseman Bobby Richardson, who made an errant relay toss near the bag to load the bases. Ken Boyer followed with a grand slam home run that held up for a 4–3 victory. Three innings earlier, Groat tagged out Mickey Mantle on a pickoff play that thwarted a two-on, two-out threat. 

Groat reached base on a fielder's choice groundout and scored on Tim McCarver's three-run homer in the 10th inning of Game 5, which saw the Cardinals score a 5–2 victory. He had an RBI groundout in the 7–5 win in the Game 7 clincher.

Final years
Statistically, the 1965 season was the worst for Groat as a regular in his career. Afterward, as part of a six-player transaction, he was traded with catcher Bob Uecker and first baseman Bill White to the Phillies, whose manager Gene Mauch had been impressed by his skills and leadership for years. Groat hit .265 in his only full season with the team, after which his contract was sold to the San Francisco Giants in June of the following year. He spent the final months of the 1967 season mostly as a late-inning defensive replacement and pinch-hitter before he announced his retirement. 
 
In his career, Groat totaled 829 runs scored, 707 runs batted in, 352 doubles, 67 triples and 39 home runs in 1,929 games. He helped turn 1,237 double plays at shortstop, the 14th most at the position in MLB history.

Hall of Fame snub
From the late 1950s to mid-1960s, Groat was a perennial All-Star candidate who ranked among the elite players at his position. Yet Groat, Dave Parker and Pete Rose are the only non-Hall of Famers to be Most Valuable Players, batting and World Series champions and appear in at least five All-Star Games in their careers. He never garnered more than 1.8 percent of the vote in any Hall of Fame election in six years on the ballot. 

"Because Groat wasn't blessed with great speed or power, he had to be seen on a regular basis to be fully appreciated," said Paul Ladewski, former Pirates beat writer and current Baseball Writers' Association of America member and Hall of Fame voter. "Even though he lost two seasons in his athletic prime because of military service, which cost him approximately 250 hits and delayed his development, his career numbers are comparable to those of contemporary middle infielders Luis Aparicio, Nellie Fox and Bill Mazeroski, all of whom are in the Hall of Fame today. Based on plate appearances, his Wins Above Replacement total is substantially better than Harold Baines, Jim Bottomley, Lou Brock, Rabbit Maranville and Lloyd Waner, who also are Hall of Fame members. Given that the bar for election has been lowered in recent years, the Veterans Committee would be wise to take a closer look at him."

In August, 2022, the Pirates organization did not include Groat in its inaugural Hall of Fame class. Former teammates Clemente and Mazeroski were among the 19 selections chosen by a panel whose names were not disclosed.

College basketball career
At Duke University, Groat was a two-time college basketball All-American (1950–51, 1951–52) and one-time Helms Foundation Player of the Year recipient (1950–51). He was the Southern Conference Player of the Year as well as UPI National Player of the Year in the 1951–52 season, when he set an NCAA record with 839 points scored. 

In his final regular-season game, Groat scored 48 points against visiting North Carolina, the most ever by an opponent in Tar Heels history.  The Blue Devils won in a 94–64 rout for their 13th consecutive triumph. Victories over Maryland and West Virginia extended the streak to 15 in the Southern Conference Tournament before the Blue Devils fell to North Carolina State 77–68 in the championship round to fall one win short of an NCAA Tournament berth. 

On May 1, 1952, Groat had his jersey number 10 retired to the rafters of Cameron Indoor Stadium on campus. It would remain the only one retired by the school for 28 years. On Nov. 18, 2007, he was inducted into the National Collegiate Basketball Hall of Fame.

From the 1979–80 to 2018–19 seasons, Groat spent 40 seasons as the radio color analyst for Pittsburgh Panthers men's basketball games. In that period, he and play-by-play partner Bill Hillgrove were the longest tenured broadcast team in the college game. His road schedule was limited to games at Duke in his final two seasons. after which his contract was not renewed.

Pro basketball career
Less than two months after Groat played his final game of the 1952 baseball season, he made his NBA debut on November 9 with the Fort Wayne Pistons. Even though the guard could not practice with the team because of his student responsibilities – he commuted from Duke to play in three exhibition games – the transition was a relatively seamless one. He scored 11 points in a 74–71 victory over the rival Indianapolis Olympians, the first for the Pistons after an 0–3 start. 

Groat quickly became a fan favorite in Fort Wayne, whose partisans took a liking to his pull-up jump shot, leaping ability and boundless energy. In only his second game, the rookie scored a career-high 25 points in a 112–83 rout of the New York Knicks, who had advanced to the NBA Finals the previous season. 

Groat saw his first season come to a halt in February, when he enlisted in the Army rather than delay the inevitable. He left the vastly improved Pistons in much better position than when he arrived – they had a 24–24 record at the time of his departure en route to a postseason berth.

When Groat was discharged in 1954, Rickey was adamant that his prized shortstop would play only baseball because of the potential health risks that a dual career could pose for him. "Mr. Rickey said, 'You have played your last game in the NBA,'" Groat recalled the conversation. "I would never have given up basketball, but I would have lost the rest of the my bonus. He played hardball." 

Groat admitted to being "heart-broken" by the news. In what would be his only season of pro basketball, he ranked second on the Pistons in points (11.9) and third assists (2.7) per game. "I have thought many times about how I would have reacted had I been able to play three years back-to-back in both sports," he said.

Other notable baseball achievements
 Eight-time NL All-Star (1959 (two games), 1960 (two games), 1962 (two games), 1963, 1964)
 Two-time NL singles leader (1954, 1960)
 One-time NL Most Valuable Player runner-up (1963)
 One of two regulars to play with teams that beat the New York Yankees in Game 7 of the World Series more than once in their careers. (The other: Don Hoak, 1955 Brooklyn Dodgers and 1960 Pirates)
 One of 13 athletes who played in both the National Basketball Association and Major League Baseball. The others: Danny Ainge, Frank Baumholtz, Hank Biasatti, Gene Conley, Chuck Connors, Dave DeBusschere, Steve Hamilton, Mark Hendrickson, Cotton Nash, Ron Reed, Dick Ricketts and Howie Schultz.
 Three-time Sports Illustrated cover subject (1960, 1963, 1966)

Golf endeavors
Groat became more active in golf after his baseball career. While he has not played the sport since 2014 because of physical limitations, he routinely shot in the 70s in his prime. In 1964, he and Pirates teammate Jerry Lynch designed and built Champion Lakes Golf Course in Ligonier, one of only three public courses to receive a four-star rating in Western Pennsylvania. As course owner and manager, he lives on the grounds and remains a familiar face there. 

Groat is the great uncle of golfer Brooks Koepka, who won the 2017 and 2018 U.S. Open, and the 2018 and 2019 PGA Championship.

Pop culture
In the Larry David HBO comedy series Curb Your Enthusiasm (S2.E5 "The Thong"), Rob Reiner convinces Larry to participate in a celebrity auction to benefit Groat's Syndrome (a fictional neurological disorder). Reiner describes it affecting "kids and adults who have a tough time controlling their hyperactivity. It's as if you were on five cups of coffee at all times." 

Reiner claims the affliction was named after the physician who discovered it. But Larry David's character speculates it was named for Groat, who he assumes must have had the disease, because as Larry puts its, "He didn't field very well because he was excited all the time."

See also

List of Major League Baseball career hits leaders
List of Major League Baseball batting champions
List of Major League Baseball annual doubles leaders
List of Major League Baseball single-game hits leaders

Notes

External links

Dick Groat GoDuke.StatsGeek.com
Dick Groat Duke Basketball Stats – Player Info

Dick Groat at SABR (Baseball BioProject)
Baseball and Basketball (NBA) Players by Baseball Almanac
Dick Groat Biography at Baseball Biography

1930 births
Living people
People from Wilkinsburg, Pennsylvania
All-American college baseball players
All-American college men's basketball players
American men's basketball players
Baseball players from Pennsylvania
Basketball players from Pennsylvania
National College Baseball Hall of Fame inductees
College basketball announcers in the United States
Duke Blue Devils baseball players
Duke Blue Devils men's basketball players
Fort Wayne Pistons draft picks
Fort Wayne Pistons players
Major League Baseball shortstops
National Collegiate Basketball Hall of Fame inductees
National League All-Stars
National League batting champions
National League Most Valuable Player Award winners
Philadelphia Phillies players
Pittsburgh Panthers basketball
Pittsburgh Pirates players
Point guards
St. Louis Cardinals players
San Francisco Giants players